HST events, things of interest related to the Hubble Space Telescope, chronologically.

2018
Hubble takes a panoramic ultraviolet light view of over 15,000 thousand galaxies (part of Hubble Deep UV (HDUV) Legacy Survey).

2013
Hubble found evidence of water jets on Jupiter's moon Europa.
Hubble finds and asteroid spouting comet-Like tails.
Hubble found a new moon of Neptune in July 2013.

2012
Hubble detects a fifth satellite for Pluto.

2011
Hubble finds evidence for fourth Pluto satellite.

1997
NICMOS installed by a Space Shuttle servicing mission.

1990
Hubble launched on April 24, 1990, with the shuttle mission STS-31.

References

Hubble Space Telescope